I'll Be Seeing You may refer to:

Film and television
I'll Be Seeing You (2004 film), a TV movie based on the novel by Mary Higgins Clark
I'll Be Seeing You (1944 film), a 1944 movie starring Joseph Cotten, Ginger Rogers, and Shirley Temple
"I'll Be Seeing You," a two-part episode of the television series Cheers

Music
"I'll Be Seeing You" (song), a popular song published in 1938 with music by Sammy Fain and lyrics by Irving Kahal featured as title track on many of the albums below
I'll Be Seeing You (Anne Murray album), 2004
I'll Be Seeing You (Jo Stafford album), 1959
I'll Be Seeing You (Etta Jones album), 1987
I'll Be Seeing You (Richard Poon album), 2010
I'll Be Seeing You, a 2009 album by Kieran Goss
I'll Be Seeing You: A Sentimental Journey, a 2006 album by Regina Carter
I'll Be Seeing You: A Sentimental Collection, a 1999 album by Beryl Davis

Literature
I'll Be Seeing You, a 1996 novel by Lurlene McDaniel
I'll Be Seeing You, a 1994 novel by Kristine Rolofson
I'll Be Seeing You, a 1993 novel by Mary Higgins Clark
I'll Be Seeing You: Poems 1962-1976, an anthology of poems by Larry Fagin

See also
Be Seeing You, a 1977 music album by Dr. Feelgood
"Be seeing you", a valediction frequently used in the TV series The Prisoner